Greenfields is a dairy company based in Malang, Indonesia and the largest dairy company in Southeast Asia. Greenfields has 2 farms and a factory at hillside of Mount Kawi in Malang Regency and Blitar Regency. The company was founded on March 14, 1997. Greenfields is a popular milk brand in Indonesia, Singapore, Malaysia, Hong Kong, Brunei, and the Philippines.

History 

In the early 1990s, Southeast Asian countries, including Indonesia, experienced very rapid economic development. As people's purchasing power increases, the need for a healthy lifestyle and high-quality food ingredients also increases. Unfortunately, the need for this is mostly filled with imported products, one of which is milk using imported powdered milk. The problem of imported milk which is very much in Indonesia is the initial idea of the formation of PT Greenfields Indonesia. On March 14, 1997, PT Greenfields Indonesia was born to a group of Australian and Indonesian business people who had expertise in the field of agribusiness. The company began by developing farms in Babadan Village, Mount Kawi, East Java, a place with a cool temperature environment for special dairy cows imported from Australia. In April 1999, began the construction of a milk processing facility that became operational in June 2000. The milk produced by this farm is high quality milk and fulfills the world's strictest requirements in microbiology. PT Greenfields Indonesia produces pasteurized milk and UHT milk in several different types, flavors and packaging sizes. At present, Greenfields farms have more than 10,000 cattle with Holstein and Jersey species. In addition to serving the domestic market, more than 50% of the production of PT Greenfields Indonesia is marketed in Singapore, Malaysia, Hong Kong, the Philippines and other countries in the region. Now, Greenfields has grown from dairy companies to dairy companies that not only produce milk, but other milk derivative products such as yogurt, cheese and whipping cream.

Products 
 Greenfields Fresh Milk (Pasteurization) available in sizes 200ml, 500ml, 1 liter and 1.89 liters with Fresh Milk flavors, Low Fat, Skimmed, Choco Malt, Strawberry and Moccachino.
 Greenfields UHT available in 1 liter packaging for in home consumption and UHT small for on the go in packs of 125ml, 200ml and 250ml.
 Greenfields Fresh Cheese available in shredded mozzarella and mozzarella block, bocconcini, ricotta, and camembert (disc.).
 Greenfields Fresh Stirred Yogurt available blueberry, strawberry, mango and original flavors in sizes of 1 kg, 500g and 125g.
 Greenfields Yogurt Drink available in mixed fruit, blueberry, mango, strawberry, peach and lychee flavors.
 Greenfields UHT Whipping cream available in 1 liter size.

References

External links 

 

Dairy products companies of Indonesia
Companies established in 1997
Indonesian brands
Indonesian companies established in 1997
Companies based in Malang